Postans is an unincorporated place and railway point in southwestern Thunder Bay District in Northwestern Ontario, Canada. It is on the Canadian National Railway Kashabowie Subdivision main line, built originally as the Canadian Northern Railway transcontinental main line, and just off Ontario Highway 11, at this point part of the Trans-Canada Highway, in both cases between the community of Kashabowie to the west and the railway point of Kabaigon to the east. Postans is also at the outlet from Postans Lake where an unnamed creek heads west to Postans Bay on Kashabowie Lake, part of the Kashabowie River.

References

Communities in Thunder Bay District